Margaret Alice Marquis (August 19, 1919 – January 19, 1993) was a Canadian-American film actress.

Marquis was the daughter of Mr. and Mrs. Leon Marquis.

Personal life

On November 1, 1937, Marquis married Universal Studios publicist David c. McCoig. She wed Robert F. Stump, a Hollywood chiropractor, in 1946; he had been one of the judges a few years earlier in a "perfect back" contest she had won; they divorced in 1947.

Selected filmography
 Penrod and Sam (1931)
 Brand of the Outlaws (1936)
 Last of the Warrens (1936)
 A Family Affair (1937)
 My Old Kentucky Home (1938)
 Cassidy of Bar 20 (1938)
Strike Up the Band (1940)
 Escort Girl (1941)

References

Bibliography
 Pitts, Michael R. Western Movies: A Guide to 5,105 Feature Films. McFarland, 2012.

External links

1919 births
1993 deaths
American film actresses
Actresses from Ontario
Canadian emigrants to the United States
People from North Bay, Ontario
20th-century American actresses
Western (genre) film actresses